Pristimantis piceus is a species of frog in the family Strabomantidae. It is endemic to Colombia and occurs in the Cordillera Central between the Antioquia Department in the north and the Cauca Department in the south. Many specimens are black in color, and the specific name piceus is Latin meaning "pitch-black".

Description
Adult males measure  and adult females  in snout–vent length. The snout is long, subacuminate in dorsal view, and rounded in lateral profile. The tympanum is distinct, but the supra-tympanic fold obscures its upper edge. Skin of the dorsum has numerous minute, low warts. The dorso-lateral fold is not present. The fingers have lateral keels and discs. The toes have fleshy keels and discs that are smaller than the finger discs. Coloration is variable, usually uniformly black, reddish-brown, or dark brown with a pale blue peri-ocular ring. Many specimens have orange spots on the flanks. The margin of the mandible shows usually some White flecks. The iris is black, chocolate, or dull bronze, with yellowish flecks. Males have large, sub-gular vocal sac.

When disturbed, these frogs may secrete a white or blue-white mucus. Presumably, this sticky secretion serves defensive purposes.

Habitat and conservation
They are at active night when they can be found on vegetation, especially in open areas on top of weeds. During the day, they occur on the ground, among low grass, or under logs and rocks.

It is a relatively widespread and common species that can locally suffer from habitat loss caused by deforestation, agriculture development, and illegal crops. It occurs in several protected areas.

References

piceus
Amphibians of the Andes
Amphibians of Colombia
Endemic fauna of Colombia
Amphibians described in 1996
Taxa named by John Douglas Lynch
Taxonomy articles created by Polbot